Vikraman Radhakrishnan (born 24 August 1988) is a Journalist, Anchor, Actor and a Politician (VCK). He made debuted into television as a host in the talk show Nadanthathu Enna? Kutramum Pinnaniyum in 2016. Vikraman is best known for his portrayal of Vikram in Vinnaithaandi Varuvaayaa (2016). He appeared in Tamil reality show Bigg Boss (Tamil season 6) as a contestant and later emerged as the 1st runner-up.

Career
Radhakrishnan began his television career in 2016, he debuted in the talk show Nadanthathu Enna? Kutramum Pinnaniyum in 2016. Later that same year he made his first acting debut in the television drama EMI-Thavanai Murai Vazhkai playing the lead role as Santhosh alongside actors Pavani Reddy, Shyam Sunder and Haripriya. He later went on to act in another drama serial called Vinnaithaandi Varuvaayaa which aired on Star Vijay starring alongside actress Madhumila.

Political Career

In 2020, Vikraman joined Viduthalai Chiruthaigal Katchi political party and was appointed as an official spokesperson of party.

Television

References

External links 
 

Tamil Nadu politicians
People from Tamil Nadu
Indian television actors
Indian soap opera actors
Bigg Boss (Tamil TV series) contestants
21st-century Indian actors
1988 births
Living people
Viduthalai Chiruthaigal Katchi politicians
Indian actor-politicians
21st-century Indian male actors